Tennis were contested at the 1994 Asian Games in Regional Park Tennis Stadium, Hiroshima, Japan from 3 to 13 October 1994. Tennis had team, doubles, and singles events for men and women, as well as a mixed doubles competition.

Japan finished first in the medal table winning three gold medals.

Medalists

Medal table

Participating nations

See also
 Tennis at the Asian Games

References 
 New Straits Times, October 3–14, 1994

External links 
 Olympic Council of Asia

 
1994 Asian Games events
1994
Asian Games
1994 Asian Games